is a 1991 Japanese anime created by Tokyo Movie Shinsha (now known as TMS Entertainment) and originally broadcast on Nippon TV from January to November 1991. The anime is based on the St. Clare's books by English children's author Enid Blyton.

Plot
Twin sisters Patricia and Isabel O'Sullivan are sent to St. Clare's by their parents, due to their fear that the twins might become negatively influenced.

Characters

Isabelle O'Sullivan 
Voice by Eriko Hara (Japanese) and Aya Bejer (Tagalog) 

Patricia O'Sullivan
Voice by Noriko Hidaka (of DoCo, Ranma ½, Inuyasha, and Death Note) (Japanese) and Aila Comla (Tagalog)

Sheila Neira
Voice by Kae Araki (of Sailor Moon R, Sailor Moon S, Sailor Moon SuperS, Mysterious Theft Saint Tail,  and Fushigi Yûgi) (Japanese)

Hillary Wentworth
Voice by Sumi Shimamoto (of Maison Ikkoku, Fire Tripper, A Little Princess Sarah, and Virgin Fleet) (Japanese) and Katherine Masilungan (Tagalog)

Jimmy
Voice by Taiki Matsuno (of xxxHolic the Movie: A Midsummer Night's Dream, The Vision of Escaflowne, and Rurouni Kenshin) (Japanese) and Pocholo Gonzales (Tagalog)

Distribution

Japan
The anime was rebroadcast on NHK-BS2 in 1998, on KBS from August 23, 2013 to September 27, 2013, and on Tokyo MX from November 14, 2013 to January 14, 2014.

Portugal
A Portuguese dub was created and broadcast on RTP2 in 1992, and later on RTP1 in 1994, under the name As Gémeas de Santa Clara.

Italy
An Italian dub was created by Deneb Film and broadcast on Italia 1 in 1993, under the name Una scuola per cambiare.

Philippines
A Tagalog dub was created and broadcast on ABS-CBN.

United Kingdom
An English dub was created and broadcast on Children's ITV.

Germany and Austria
A German dub was created and broadcast on ZDF, Kinderkanal and ORF 1 from October 17, 1997 to November 24, 1997, under the name Hanni und Nanni.

France
A French dub was created by Studio One Take Productions and broadcast on Teletoon in 1997, under the name Les Jumelles de St-Clare.

Spain, Catalonia and Latin America
A Catalan dub was created and broadcast on K3 and TV3 in 1998, under the name Les Bessones a St. Clare's. Antena 3 broadcast the series in European Spanish, as well as TV Azteca in Mexico (Latin American Spanish/Mexican dub), both titled Las Gemelas de St. Claire.

Theme songs
Openings

Lyricist: Chisato Moritaka / Composer: Hideo Saitō / Singers: Chisato Moritaka

Endings

Lyricist: Chisato Moritaka / Composer: Shinji Yasuda / Singers: Chisato Moritaka

References

External links
Mischievous Twins: The Tales of St. Clare's at Tokyo Movie's webpage 
The Twins at St. Clare's at TMS Entertainment's website 
Mischievous Twins: The Tales of St. Clare's at KBS's website 
Mischievous Twins: The Tales of St. Clare's at Tokyo MX's website 

1991 anime television series debuts
1991 Japanese television series debuts
1991 Japanese television series endings
Nippon TV original programming
School life in anime and manga
TMS Entertainment
Tokyo MX original programming
Animated television series about sisters
Animated television series about twins
Adaptations of works by Enid Blyton